Cant, CANT, canting, or canted may refer to:

Language
 Cant (language), a secret language
 Beurla Reagaird, a language of the Scottish Highland Travellers
 Scottish Cant, a language of the Scottish Lowland Travellers
 Shelta or the Cant, a language of the Irish Travellers
 Thieves' cant, a language of criminals
 Canting arms, heraldic puns on the bearer's name
 Can't, contraction of cannot

Other uses
 Cant (architecture), part of a facade
 CANT (aviation) (Cantieri Aeronautici e Navali Triestini), an aircraft manufacturer
 Cant (log), a log partially processed in a sawmill
 Cant (road/rail), an angle of a road or track
 Cant (shooting), referring to a gun being tilted around the longitudinal axis, rather than being horizontally levelled
 Cant (surname), a family name and persons with it
 Canting, a tool used in making batik
 Chris Taylor (Grizzly Bear musician), an American performer
 University of Canterbury, a New Zealand university which uses Cantuar or Cant as an abbreviation for their name in post-nominal letters

See also
 CANT (disambiguation)
 
 Canté, a commune in Ariège, France
 Canter (disambiguation)
 Canticle
 Kant (disambiguation)
 Kante (disambiguation)